Barenaked in America is a 1999 documentary film about the Canadian band Barenaked Ladies filmed during the 1998-1999 Stunt tour. Directed by actor Jason Priestley, the film was first shown at the Toronto International Film Festival. The band and director introduced the film at the Winter Garden theatre.

Barenaked in America was originally released in the United States through a distribution deal with Blockbuster Video, and was available only for rental in VHS format. Blockbuster put many of its remaining copies on the sale rack, in an effort to eliminate its inventory, after their exclusive deal had expired.

Barenaked in America has since been released on DVD in territories outside of North America, and has run on premium movie channels in the US. However, due to a rights issue, the film was not released for sale in the U.S. until on June 1, 2018, the band announced that a 20th Anniversary Edition of Stunt would be released in September that would include a CD/DVD package featuring including Barenaked in America.

Concert 
Songs
Concert recorded at Marine Midland Arena on October 9, 1998

 "It's All Been Done"
 "Who Needs Sleep?"
 "Straw Hat and Old Dirty Hank"
 "Alcohol"
 "Call and Answer"
 "Some Fantastic"
 "One Week"
 "Break Your Heart"
 "The Old Apartment"
 "Brian Wilson"
 Credits ("If I Had $1000000")

Personnel
 Jim Creeggan - double and electric bass, vocals
 Kevin Hearn - keyboards, electric guitar
 Steven Page - vocals, acoustic and electric guitars, flute
 Ed Robertson - acoustic and electric guitars, vocals
 Tyler Stewart - drums
 Chris Brown - organ, piano, cowbell
 Rob Menegoni - percussion

See also
Stunt

References

External links
 

Barenaked Ladies
1999 films
Rockumentaries
1990s English-language films